Zhou Hexi (born 28 October 1992) is a Chinese professional Go player.

He was the runner-up for the 25th Tianyuan.

Promotion record

Career record
2011: 17 wins, 9 losses

Titles and runners-up

References

1992 births
Living people
Chinese Go players